Sean Gleeson is the name of:

Seán Gleeson, actor, director and producer
Sean Gleeson (rugby league) rugby league player
Sean Gleeson (Home and Away), a fictional character from the Australian soap opera Home and Away
Sean Gleeson (American football), American football coach